Club Med SAS, commonly known as Club Med and previously known as Club Méditerranée SA, is a French travel and tourism operator headquartered in Paris, specializing in all-inclusive holidays. Founded in 1950, the company has been primarily owned by the Chinese conglomerate Fosun Group since 2013. Club Med either wholly owns or operates nearly eighty all-inclusive resort villages in holiday locations around the world.

History

Foundation 

The Club was started in 1950 by Belgian entrepreneur Gérard Blitz.  Blitz had opened a low-priced summer colony of tents on the Spanish island of Majorca, then another one in the island of Djerba (Tunisia). Great entertainer, Blitz was however no businessman and he went bankrupt in 1953. The main creditor was the tents supplier, Gilbert Trigano, the French "King of Camping"; Trigano took control of the Club and slowly pushed  Blitz aside. The first official Club Med was built the next year in Palinuro, Salerno,  Italy. The original villages were simple: Members stayed in unlit straw huts on a beachfront, sharing communal washing facilities. Such villages have been replaced with modern blocks or huts with ensuite facilities.

Expansion 
Because of reckless spending, the Club was on the verge of bankruptcy in 1961. It was saved by the 35-year-old Baron Edmond de Rothschild after he had visited a resort and enjoyed his stay. With Rothschild financing, the number of villages increased greatly under Trigano's leadership from 1963 to 1993. Winter villages, providing skiing and winter sports tuition, were introduced in 1956 at Leysin, Switzerland. In 1965, the first club outside the Mediterranean was opened in Tahiti. Club Med broadened its reach by opening villages in the French Caribbean (Guadeloupe and Martinique). 

Originally attracting mainly singles and young couples, the Club later became primarily a destination for families, with the first Mini Club opening in 1967.

Club Méditerranée S.A. had a branch in the USA named Club Méditerranée Inc, with several partners including Crédit Lyonnais and American Express. In 1974, upon his arrival as the new CEO of the Club for North America, Jean Lallemand, one of the first members of the Club and responsible of its large presence in Italy, hired as marketing manager the French HEC Jacques Bacon, who made the Club a huge success within 3 years through an aggressive and very efficient promotion; it was he who suggested the name Club Med. The new name was at that time reserved to the North American market, but later became the name of the mother company as well.

In the early 1970s the Club had bought from her owner Claude Lelouche the famous revolutionary three-mast sailing boat Vendredi 13, installed 4 berths and a bath-room,  and based her at the Buccaneers Creek village in Martinique for one-day to several day cruises. Huge success among members, so, in 1976, it bought the huge sailing boat built by solo sailor Alain Colas, who had just lost the Solo Transatlantic Race Plymouth-Newport to his enemy Eric Tabarly. It renamed it Club Médiderranée and based it in Martinique for 2-3-day cruises.  Another huge success, so, the Club built a second one, a monster named Club Med 2.  The Club has also ceased to be a club in the legal sense, changing from a not-for-profit association to a for-profit public limited company (French SA) in 1995. However, each new customer is still charged a membership fee upon joining, and returning customers are charged an annual fee as well.

Diversification 
In the 1990s, the Club's fortunes declined because competitors copied its concepts and holidaymakers demanded more sophisticated offerings. Other reasons explain its demise: the arrogance of the Triganos, who were convinced that they could buy any property, even one in a bad location, put on it the name "Club Med" and it would be a success; they multiplied the villages, so many so fast that they could not find enough good "chefs de village", who make the villages what they are: bad chef = bad village. In 1997, the shareholders finally understood and sacked the two Triganos and replaced them with Philippe Bourguignon, former CEO of Novotel USA. Bourguignon aimed to change the Club "from a holiday village company to a services company". The club took over a chain of French gyms, launched bar/restaurant complexes known as Club Med World in Paris and Montreal, and commenced a budget resort concept aimed at young adults. Oyyo was the first such resort, opened at Monastir in Tunisia. Thirteen new villages were planned for the new century.

Relaunch 
The change in strategy was not successful, and the Club fell into a deep loss following the 11 September 2001 attacks in the U.S. In 2002, a new CEO, Henri Giscard d'Estaing, son of the former French President, was appointed. His strategy was to refocus on the holiday villages and attract upmarket vacationers.  Club Med World Montreal and many villages, particularly those in North America or with more basic facilities, were closed. The Club returned to profitability in 2005.

In 2004, the hotel group Accor became the largest shareholder, but it sold most of its stake in 2006, announcing that it wished to refocus on its core businesses. From 2001 onward, the resort company worked to rebrand itself as upscale and family-oriented.

In 2006 and 2007, Club Med and its partners dedicated a total of $530 million to renovate several resorts.

Acquisition 

In February 2015, Fosun International Ltd.'s Gaillon Invest II and The Silverfern Group finalized a takeover deal of Club Méditerranée S.A. The acquisition culminated a bidding war that began in May 2013, which was conducted by Gaillon, a special investment vehicle used by Fosun, to execute its bidding for Club Med. The two-year-long war boosted the price of the company from the initial €541 million "friendly bid" in 2013 up to the final sale price of €939 million ($1.07 billion). Gaillon Invest's chairman, Jiannong Qian, believes that Chinese ownership of the company is crucial to tap into China's huge population of potential tourists. Following the takeover, Chairman and President of Club Méditerranée SA, Henri Giscard d'Estaing, was named President of Club Med SAS.

In popular culture 

The phrase "Club Med- a cheap holiday in other people's misery" appeared as a Situationist slogan, written in graffiti in Paris, May 1968. The phrase was described as a commentary on alienation, domination, and "the false promises of modern life". The slogan was later given a nod to in the opening lyrics of the Sex Pistols song "Holidays in the Sun".

The Club Med style of vacation was satirized in the 1978 film, Les bronzés (released in English as French Fried Vacation) directed by Patrice Leconte.  Sequels Les Bronzés font du ski and Les Bronzés – Amis pour la Vie were released in 1979 and 2006 respectively.

In Jean-Luc Godard's 'La Chinoise' (1967), the character Guillaume (Jean-Pierre Léaud) talks about his father who had fought Germans in the war, now ran Club Med resort working along the lines of concentration camps. In regards with the Situationalist slogan, this scene establishes an image from Dal lake of Kashmir.

The 1983 film Copper Mountain: A Club Med Experience, starring Jim Carrey and Alan Thicke, is a quasi-commercial for the now-closed Club Med village in the U.S. ski resort at Copper Mountain, Colorado.

The 1986  ABC TV movie Club Med stars Jack Scalia and Linda Hamilton as a Club Med manager and guest, respectively, who fall in love.

In 2004, a Korean TV drama broadcast by MBC titled First Love of a Royal Prince was filmed in Club Med Bali, Sahoro, and Bora Bora. In the drama, the main actress, Sung Yu-ri, played Kim Yu Bin, a GO.

Within the United States, minimum security prisons can be referred to as Club Fed.

In 2004, The American comedy team Broken Lizard released a comedy slasher film named Club Dread, where a paradise resort for young people full of sex, drugs and rock and roll become targets of a deranged killer.

Ships

Current ships

Former ships

References

External links 

 Club Med Official website

French companies established in 1950
Companies based in Paris
Transport companies established in 1950
French brands
Bundled products or services
Fosun International
2013 mergers and acquisitions
French subsidiaries of foreign companies
Travel and holiday companies of France